Benjamin Richard Edwin Cawston, known as Ben Cawston, is a Racquets (Rackets) player currently ranked no.1 in the World (March 2022).

Tournaments 
Cawston is a two time US Open Singles Champion (2022, 2020). Cawston is the current Invitational Singles Champion (World's Top 8 players event) an event he also won in 2019. Ben is the current holder of the Western Open Singles (Chicago) and the Manchester Gold Racket Singles and Doubles. Ben is the youngest player in history to be ranked at no.1 in the world and also have a challenge for the world championship (November 2022).

Cawston previously was the youngest player in history to win the British Amateur Singles Championship in 2017 (Aged 18) and played at the Queens Club, a tournament dating back to 1888.

References 

Living people
Year of birth missing (living people)